Harold Ferguson Fishleigh (May 11, 1903 – September 23, 1998) was a Canadian politician who was a Member of Provincial Parliament in Legislative Assembly of Ontario from 1951 to 1959. He represented the riding of Woodbine as a Progressive Conservative member. He was born in Wingham, Ontario and was a pharmacist and realtor. He died in 1998.

References

External links

1903 births
1998 deaths
Progressive Conservative Party of Ontario MPPs
People from Wingham, Ontario